Burlington Towne Centre is a station on the River Line light rail system, located on West Broad Street in Burlington, Burlington County, New Jersey, United States within the Burlington Historic District. The tracks run in the middle of the street in a thin trench, so while it does run in the middle of the street, it is not considered "street running." Like many other River Line stations, the Towne Centre station is made up of a raised, accessible platform with ticket machines and a small passenger shelter. Of note, the station name uses the spelling "centre" rather than the more usual "center".

The station opened on March 15, 2004. Southbound service from the station is available to Camden, New Jersey. Northbound service is available to the Trenton Rail Station with connections to New Jersey Transit trains to New York City, SEPTA trains to Philadelphia, and Amtrak trains. Transfer to the PATCO Speedline is available at the Walter Rand Transportation Center.

Transfers 
New Jersey Transit buses: 409 and 413
 BurLink B6

References

External links

 Station from Google Maps Street View

2004 establishments in New Jersey
Burlington, New Jersey
River Line stations
Railway stations in Burlington County, New Jersey
Railway stations in the United States opened in 2004